"Every Year, Every Christmas" is a song by American singer Luther Vandross. It was written by Vandross and Richard Marx for his tenth studio album, the holiday album This Is Christmas (1995), while production was helmed by Vandross. The original Christmas song received moderate rotation on radio and peaked at number 32 on the US Billboard R&B/Hip-Hop Airplay chart. Singer Patti LaBelle also covered the song, which appeared on her 2007 Christmas album Miss Patti's Christmas. The LaBelle version was spoken at the end the song dedicated to Vandross.

Track listings

Charts

References

1990s ballads
1995 songs
Luther Vandross songs
1995 singles
Soul ballads
Contemporary R&B ballads
Songs written by Luther Vandross
Songs written by Richard Marx
Epic Records singles
American Christmas songs